The 2008 FIFA Futsal World Cup – Final Round took place from 16 October to 19 October 2008.

Bracket

Matches

Semi-finals

Match of Third Place

Final

Winner 

- Final Round, 2008 Fifa Futsal World Cup